Jorge Sievert Heine Lorenzen (born 24 May 1948) is a Chilean politician who served as minister of State and as ambassador of Chile to China.

References

External links
 

1948 births
Living people
Chilean people of German descent
University of Chile alumni
York University alumni
Stanford University alumni
20th-century Chilean politicians
21st-century Chilean politicians
Party for Democracy (Chile) politicians